The 1969 Duke Blue Devils football team represented Duke University during the 1969 NCAA University Division football season.

Schedule

References

Duke
Duke Blue Devils football seasons
Duke Blue Devils football